Twinsburg Stamping was a Chrysler automotive stamping factory in Twinsburg, Ohio. The factory opened in 1957 and closed on July 31, 2010. It processed, on average, over 26,000 tons of steel a month and shipped stamped panels to assembly plants in Mexico, the United States, Austria, and Canada. The former Chrysler Corporation began modernizing the press room with new Verson "C" Transfer Presses in 1994.

This modernization continued, even after the merger with Germany's Daimler-Benz, through the early 2000s. New equipment included additional Verson Transfer Presses as well as new Schuler and Mueller Weingarten Transfer and Tandem Presses. New Schuler blankers were also added during the early 2000s, and the plant quickly became one of the most modern stamping plants in North America. 

By 2006, the plant produced stampings and assemblies for several Chrysler, Dodge, and Jeep vehicles with the help of 228 robots and 1,7600 people. 

Through numerous bad decisions from parent company DaimlerChrysler, the company slid into another one of its bust cycles. After the bankruptcy of 2009, the President's Automotive Task Force decided that Twinsburg would close, and the plant was put up for auction. As of August 1, 2012, the only part of the plant still standing is the main cafeteria and administration building.

Products Lines 
Stampings and assemblies

 Chrysler Pacifica
 Chrysler Minivans
 Chrysler Neon
 Dodge Caravan
 Dodge Durango
 Dodge Ram
 Dodge Dakota
 Jeep Liberty

References

Chrysler factories
Motor vehicle assembly plants in Ohio
Buildings and structures in Summit County, Ohio